Nick Sikkuark (21 May 1943 – 19 December 2013) was an Inuit artist from Kugaaruk, Nunavut.

Life
Born at Garry Lake, Nunavut (then part of the Keewatin), Sikkuark was orphaned at a young age. He was then taken in by the Oblate Fathers. As a young man he studied for the clergy in Winnipeg and Ottawa before settling in Kugaaruk, Nunavut, then called Pelly Bay. It was there that he began to work as an artist full-time.

Work
His works are mainly in whale bone, caribou antler, and walrus ivory, and are characterized by "droll, macabre wit."

References

External links
 Entry for Nick Sikkuark on the Union List of Artist Names

1943 births
2013 deaths
Inuit sculptors
Inuit from the Northwest Territories
Inuit from Nunavut
People from Kugaaruk